is a diary of 20th-century Indian philosopher Jiddu Krishnamurti (18951986). The handwritten journal eschews the first person, and is composed of entries dated in 1973 and 1975. The entries touch on favorite Krishnamurti topics like meditation, the dangerous effects of identification and of conditioned thinking, and the need for radical individual psychological reset. The diary is also known for poetic and nuanced descriptions of nature, and of nature's relationship with human consciousness. It was originally published in book form in 1982.

About the work

Mary Lutyens, authorized biographer and longtime friend of Krishnamurti, writes in Foreword that in  he "suddenly started keeping a journal. Yet elsewhere she states that she had at the time suggested the journal to Krishnamurti. This is affirmed in contemporary notes by Mary Zimbalist, Krishnamurti's personal secretary and close associate; she writes that following Lutyens' suggestion Krishnamurti recounted a strange experience he reputedly had two weeks earlier, and agreed to start the journal. He began writing the next day,  while at Brockwood Park in Hampshire.

Krishnamurti kept writing (in pencil) almost daily for a period of six weeks, during his stay at Brockwood Park and then while in Rome. However according to Zimbalist additional material was written six years later. In her notes she states that Krishnamurti added to the journal starting on  while in Switzerland; he continued writing intermittently in the fall of 1981, when he was back at Brockwood Park.

Lutyens considers the published diary "one of two books K  wrote himself", as almost all known Krishnamurti texts are verbatim or edited transcripts of his talks and discussions, edited collections of his notes, and material he dictated in person or on audiotape. In print, it contains  between one and two pages each. Krishnamurti wrote in second or third person, referring to himself in the latter mode exclusively; in a few cases there is an anonymous interlocutor. A typical entry expounds on one or more of Krishnamurti's favorite themes through observations of nature, consciousness, and life that often flow seamlessly into each other.

A commentator stated that in this and other diaries "depictions of nature are stunning in their fine detail, suggestive nuance, and variety. The observations about consciousness and about meditation are at one with the teachings as they were articulated to the public." He adds that in the Journal there are no overt references to the reputed experiences called , that permeate the previously published Krishnamurti's Notebook (1976). Instead, in this diary "he psychological observations closely parallel his statements from the public platform, although in a somewhat condensed and, if possible, a more immediate form. Lutyens believes this diary reveals "more about  personally than any of his other work and offers, "only in his  we have these lovely descriptions of nature.

Publication history

The book was originally published in early 1982 by Gollancz in the UK and by Harper & Row in the US. The UK edition, in hardcover, has a portrait photograph of Krishnamurti on the front jacket; the US paperback a front cover portrait illustration of him. Without a table of contents, the short foreword by Lutyens is followed by the diary entries ordered and titled according to place and date. Copyright was held by the Krishnamurti Foundation Trust (KFT), a UK organization.

In 2003, the Krishnamurti Foundation India (Chennai) published a "2nd revised edition", while another paperback, published by the KFT in 2004, was  available in several languages as a print-on-demand title. Both editions feature still life front covers; small author photographs are on the back cover.

Select editions

Reception
A review in the Yoga Journal commended the book as "vividly illustrating his  philosophy of meditation-in-action", and the author as an "observer of great compassion" whose sensitive descriptions are applied to the smallest detail. The work's frequent commentary on meditation, and its perceived overall meditative quality, has been used as an example for certain types of meditation practice in school settings; such practices are considered an aid in reducing antisocial behavior and classroom tensions.

The work has been cited in 21st century theoretical revisions of psychoanalysis, and has inspired published poetry. The book's reputed favorable public reception lead to the publication in 1987 of yet another Krishnamurti diary, Krishnamurti to Himself.

See also
 Jiddu Krishnamurti bibliography

Notes

References

 .
 
 .
 
 .

External links
 "Krishnamurti's Journal" Home page for the full text, hosted as a free resource at J. Krishnamurti Online, the "official repository of the teachings of J. Krishnamurti". Krishnamurti foundations.

1982 non-fiction books
Books by Jiddu Krishnamurti
Diaries
Harper & Row books
Philosophy books